Farewell Fitzroy is the second studio album by Australian blues and roots band Busby Marou. The album was released in October 2013 and debuted at number 5 on the ARIA Charts. A "Days of Gold (Deluxe Edition)" was released a year later.

Reception

Sarah Elks from The Australian said "Busby Marou neatly sidesteps the sophomore slump with Farewell Fitzroy, a rich, warm and joyful follow-up to their breakthrough debut.".

Good Morning Country said "Mandolins, ukulele and whistles – stories of travels across the globe, and the pull of home. Like catching up with old friends you've been hanging out to hear from, Farewell Fitzroy is Busby Marou's welcome return, the highly anticipated second album from the Queensland duo... Farewell Fitzroy is 12 tracks of folk-pop and country-tinged song craft, distinctly Australian storytelling, and the gifted musicianship of Tom Busby and Jeremy Marou."

Track listing

Charts

Release history

References

2013 albums
Busby Marou albums